Nigel John Mills is a British Conservative Party politician and former chartered accountant. He has been Member of Parliament (MP) for Amber Valley in Derbyshire since the 2010 general election. He has campaigned for Leave Means Leave, a Eurosceptic group.

Early life and career
Mills was born in Jacksdale, Nottinghamshire, in 1974 and was privately educated at Loughborough Grammar School in Leicestershire. He went on to study Classics at Newcastle University.

Mills qualified as a Chartered accountant in 1999, working for PricewaterhouseCoopers until early 2010, moving on to Deloitte working as a Tax adviser to businesses, specialising in transfer pricing.

Political career
Mills was first elected as a Conservative Councillor for Amber Valley Borough Council in 2004 when he won in Horsley, Horsley Woodhouse and Shipley ward. He was re-elected in 2008, but did not stand again in 2012 after he became an MP. He was also a Heanor and Loscoe Town Councillor.

He was first elected as the Member of Parliament (MP) for Amber Valley in Derbyshire at the 2010 general election, when he won the seat with a majority of 536.

During Parliamentary recess in 2011, Mills volunteered with Voluntary Service Overseas in Tajikistan in a placement designed to improve the business environment and therefore stimulate the creation of jobs for more economically and socially vulnerable groups in the country. In 2012 Mills volunteered again in Tajikistan with VSO, advising the government on how to improve the business environment to attract investment and create jobs.

In October 2011, Mills voted for a referendum on Britain's membership of the European Union. In August 2013, he voted against the Government's motion calling for support of possible British intervention in Syria.

Mills attracted media attention in December 2014 after being caught playing Candy Crush on his iPad during a Work and Pensions Committee meeting, reportedly over a two and a half hour period. Mills said: "There was a bit of the meeting that I wasn't focusing on and I probably had a game or two.". He initially said to The Sun that he had been playing the game and told the newspaper that he would "try not do it again". He later apologised "unreservedly" for his behaviour.

He retained his seat at the 2015 general election and 2017 general election.

In May 2016, it was reported that Mills was one of a number of Conservative MPs being investigated by police in the 2015 party spending investigation, for allegedly spending more than the legal limit on constituency election campaign expenses. In May 2017, the Crown Prosecution Service said that while there was evidence of inaccurate spending returns, it did not "meet the test" for further action.

In September 2017, Mills was criticised in local media for claiming expenses for first class tickets when he travelled by rail, despite official guidance from parliamentary watchdog IPSA – set up in the wake of the 2009 expenses scandal – saying politicians should "consider value for money" when booking tickets. Mills stated that his claims were permissible within the expenses rules and that the first class tickets were cheaper than some standard class tickets available.

Mills is a member of the Work and Pensions Select Committee, Northern Ireland Affairs Select Committee, and the Immigration Bill Committee, having previously sat on the Administration Committee.

At the 2019 general election, Mills increased his vote share by over 7%, and retained Amber Valley with a majority of 16,886 votes.

Personal life
Mills was the partner of Gillian Shaw, the Conservative candidate for Amber Valley in the general elections of 2001 and 2005; she died of cancer in 2006. He became engaged to Alice Elizabeth Ward in January 2013; they married in September 2013.

He lives in Langley Mill in Derbyshire and London. He is a season ticket holder at Notts County F.C. and is a member of Nottinghamshire County Cricket Club.

Award
In November 2013, Mills shared The Spectator's Parliamentarian of the Year Award along with 14 other MPs for voting against tighter regulation of the press, which had been proposed following developments such as the News International phone hacking scandal. The group of 15 rebels lost the vote as 531 MPs voted for the bill in question, with their vote being on the grounds of protecting press freedom.

References

External links
Nigel Mills MP Conservative Party profile
Nigel Mills MP Amber Valley Conservatives profile

1974 births
Living people
Conservative Party (UK) MPs for English constituencies
Alumni of Newcastle University
People educated at Loughborough Grammar School
UK MPs 2010–2015
UK MPs 2015–2017
UK MPs 2017–2019
UK MPs 2019–present
People from Jacksdale
People from Amber Valley
British Eurosceptics